The 28th Genie Awards were held on March 3, 2008 to honour films released in 2007. The ceremony was held at the Metro Toronto Convention Centre in Toronto, Ontario, Canada. The show was broadcast on E! and Independent Film Channel and hosted by Sandra Oh.

Controversy
The nominations for 2008 faced some controversy when director Jason Reitman issued a statement expressing his disappointment that the hit film Juno, which had a Canadian director, Canadian stars (Elliot Page and Michael Cera) and a Canadian crew, and was filmed in Canada, did not qualify for a nomination. Sara Morton, the head of the Academy of Canadian Cinema and Television, issued a statement indicating that the film — which was produced by an American film studio — had not been submitted for Genie Award consideration.

Top nominations 
 Eastern Promises and Shake Hands with the Devil - 12
 Away from Her - 7
 The Tracey Fragments - 6
 Continental, A Film without Guns and Silk - 5
 Days of Darkness - 4

Nominees

Notes

References

External links 
Genie Awards official site

 

Gen
Genie Awards
Genie Awards
Gen